Don't Look Down is the second studio album by American recording artist Skylar Grey. It was released on July 5, 2013 by KidinaKorner and Interscope Records. The album's production was primarily handled by Alex da Kid and J.R. Rotem, along with Eminem, who served as an executive producer on the album. The album features guest appearances from Big Sean, Eminem, Travis Barker and Angel Haze.

Background 
Don't Look Down was scheduled to be released in the fall of 2011, under the title Invinsible, a portmanteau of "invisible" and "invincible", an idea which was given to her by American musician Marilyn Manson. Grey had said that the album would be a complete departure from any of her previous work, stating in interviews with Los Angeles Times and Rap-Up, that the album's sound is "...commercial, yet avant-garde...", with "...cinematic beats and atmospheric hooks...", and "...sonically I can tell you that every song sounds different and it's really diverse, kind of going from cinematic to fun to dark. Alex and I really push each other creatively...". In an October 2012 interview with Rolling Stone, Grey re-titled the album to its current namesake and announced that American rapper Eminem, would executive produce the album. She also said she had been working with J. R. Rotem.

Promotion and singles 
The album's lead single, "C'mon Let Me Ride" was released on December 11, 2012, and features rapper Eminem. The official music video for the single was released on VEVO the same day. The song peaked at #33 on Pop Songs in the United States. In the meanwhile, Grey released "Final Warning" on April 16, 2013; it was the album's second single. The official music video was released on May 14, 2013. On June 4, 2013, "Wear Me Out" was premiered online. The music video was released a week later. On the US iTunes Store during the week of release, the album's title song "Tower (Don't Look Down)" was featured as "single of the week"; it was released as a promotional single for free. "White Suburban" is the fourth song from the album to receive the music video treatment. The video premiered on July 3, 2013. In August, Grey confirmed that she had filmed a music video for "Back from the Dead" featuring Big Sean and Travis Barker.

Critical reception 

Don't Look Down garnered generally mixed reception from music critics. At Metacritic, they assign a weighted score to ratings and reviews from selected music critics, and the album has a Metascore of 58, which is based upon six reviews. This means it has been given "mixed or average" reception. At The New York Times, Jon Pareles gave it a positive review, and affirmed that "angst, melody and a hip-hop backbone are a promising combination." Sarah Rodman of The Boston Globe gave a positive review, and stated "if the music gods smile favorably upon her, Grey will soon be known as a solo artist in her own right, thanks to the gifts for melody and turning a phrase displayed on this captivating debut under her current nom de pop."

At Knoxville News Sentinel, Chuck Campbell feels the release "may not clearly define who Grey is, but it's fitfully gutsy." Melinda Newman of HitFix told the album "sounds like Grey made the album she wanted to: one that shows her many different sides: lover, fighter, muse... but your appreciation for it will depend upon your tolerance for the often misplaced reliance on beats." At Newsday, Glenn Gamboa alluded to how the listener will "keep waiting for her to show some emotion -- any emotion." At New York Post, Michaelangelo Matos affirmed while "the occasional misfire aside, the R&B-leaning pop rocker knows how to write a hook". Gary Graff of The Oakland Press stated that this is a "somewhat messy 12-song set that seems to pit what Grey wants to be — or thinks she should — against her natural creative leanings." At USA Today, Elysa Gardner told that Grey "has successfully collaborated [with] other artists", but without her collaborators, Grey "conveys less a personality than a variety of poses evoking clichés reinforced by her accessible but unremarkable hip-hop-fueled pop." But, Ted Scheinan of Slant Magazine was against this notion, when he wrote that in "complicating matters further, executive producer Eminem allows far too many cooks in the kitchen, a reflexive inclusivity that leaves the album feeling over-processed."

Scheinan of Slant Magazine feels "Don't Look Down is the sound of an artist negotiating with her own MC impulses, of a talented lyricist whose pop instincts tell her to abridge herself." In addition, Scheinan noted "at heart, Don't Look Down is a vaguely hip-hop-inflected homage to '90s pop, not so much uninteresting as underwhelming and repetitive in its orchestration." At Allmusic, Stephen Thomas Erlewine said the release "come[s] across as nothing more than bubblegum Lana Del Rey." Will Hermes at Rolling Stone called "Final Warning" mere "tabloid fodder and "C'mon Let Me Ride" sounds "like an over-the-top hookup plea", however he wrote "you've gotta love a pop star who titles a song about unplanned pregnancy 'Shit, Man!'" In concluding, Hermes noted the "stirring 'White Suburban' suggests Grey might, in the end, make a more convincing good girl." At Now, Tabassum Siddiqui feels "given Grey's connection to music's biggest headline-makers, it's ironic that her own output isn't all that memorable.". Mark Grondin from Spectrum Pulse gave it a 5/10 said that she struggled to come out from Eminem's shadow and struggled to match the production. And that the album was bland. 

It was placed at No. 79 on Amazon's Best Albums of 2013 list.

Commercial performance 
In its first week of release Don't Look Down debuted at number 8 on the Billboard 200, selling 24,000 copies in the United States.  The album has sold 62,000 copies in the United States as of August 2016.

Track listings 

Notes
 denotes co-producer
"C'mon Let Me Ride" contains portions of "Bicycle Race", written by Freddie Mercury.

Charts

Personnel

Musicians
Skylar Grey – vocals
Additional musicians
Travis Barker – drums (track 1)
Big Sean – vocals (track 1)
Eminem – vocals (track 5)
Angel Haze – vocals (track 10)

Additional personnel
Alex da Kid – executive producer
Eminem – executive producer
Mike Del Rio - Producer (Tracks 5, 9)
Jayson DeZuzio – producer (tracks 7, 9 and 10), co-producer (track 8)
Ross Golan – co-producer (track 1)
Skylar Grey – producer (track 10), co-producer (tracks 6–8)
Ill Factor – co-producer (track 4)
J.R. Rotem – producer (tracks 1, 3, 4 and 8)

Release history

iTunes Session

iTunes Session is the fifth extended play by American singer-songwriter Skylar Grey. It contains nine songs. The EP was released elusively to the iTunes store on October 15, 2013.

Track listing

References

2013 albums
Interscope Records albums
Albums produced by Eminem
Skylar Grey albums
Albums produced by Alex da Kid
Albums produced by J. R. Rotem
Interscope Geffen A&M Records albums
Kidinakorner albums